The 2015-16 season of the Azerbaijan Women's Volleyball Super League was the annual season of the country's highest volleyball level. The League of Azerbaijan began on November 6 and included the Georgian Tbilisi club and an Azerbaijani Junior team. Azerrail Baku won the championship final series 3-0 matches over Telekom Baku and Lokomotiv Baku won the bronze medal. The American Madison Kingdon from Azerrail Baku became league's Most Valuable Player.

Teams
 Lokomotiv Baku
 Azeryol Baku
 Azerrail Baku
 Telekom Baku
 Gençlik
 Tbilisi

Squad

Program

Round I

|}

|}

|}

|}

|}

|}

|}

|}

|}

|}

|}

|}

3rd place

|}

Final

|}

Awards
MVP:  Madison Kingdon (Azerrail Baku)
MVP of Final :  Odina Bayramova (Azerrail Baku)
Best Scorer :  Aneta Havlíčková (Lokomotiv Baku)
Best Outside Hitter :  Yelyzaveta Samadova (Telekom Baku)
Best Outside Hitter :  Stephanie Niemer (Azeryol Baku)
Best Blocker :  Jessica Susan Tow-Arnett (Azerrail Baku)
Best Setter :  Nootsara Tomkom (Azerrail Baku)
Best Receiver :  Odina Bayramova (Azerrail Baku)
Best Digger :  Brenda Castillo (Lokomotiv Baku)
Best Libero :  Valeriya Mammadova (Azerrail Baku)
Best Server :  Malika Kanthong (Azeryol Baku)

References

External links
 Volleyball in Azerbaijan

Volleyball competitions in Azerbaijan